Ernst Kaltenbrunner (4 October 190316 October 1946) was a high-ranking Austrian SS official during the Nazi era and a major perpetrator of the Holocaust. After the assassination of Reinhard Heydrich in 1942, and a brief period under Heinrich Himmler, Kaltenbrunner was the third Chief of the Reich Security Main Office (RSHA), which included the offices of Gestapo, Kripo and SD, from January 1943 until the end of World War II in Europe.

Kaltenbrunner joined the Nazi Party in 1930 and the SS in 1931, and by 1935 he was considered a leader of the Austrian SS. In 1938, he assisted in the Anschluss and was given command of the SS and police force in Austria. In January 1943, Kaltenbrunner was appointed chief of the RSHA, succeeding Reinhard Heydrich, who was assassinated in May 1942. 

A committed anti-Semite and fanatical Hitler loyalist, Kaltenbrunner oversaw a period in which the genocide of Jews intensified. He was the highest-ranking member of the SS to face trial (Himmler having committed suicide in May 1945) at the Nuremberg trials, where he was found guilty of war crimes and crimes against humanity. Kaltenbrunner was sentenced to death and executed by hanging 16 October 1946.

Biography
Kaltenbrunner was born in Ried im Innkreis, Austria, the son of a lawyer, spent his early years and primary education in Raab and later attended the Realgymnasium in Linz.  Raised in a nationalist family, he was childhood friends with  Adolf Eichmann, the infamous SS officer who played a key role in implementing the Nazis' "Final Solution" against Europe's Jews. After Gymnasium, Kaltenbrunner went on to obtain his PhD in law at Graz University in 1926. 

He worked at a law firm in Salzburg for a year before opening his own law office in Linz. He had deep scars on his face reportedly from dueling in his student days, although some sources attribute them to a car accident.

On 14 January 1934, Kaltenbrunner married Elisabeth Eder (born 20 October 1908, Linz, Upper Austria - 20 May 2002, Linz, Upper Austria), who was also a Nazi Party member; the couple had three children. In addition to the children from his marriage, Kaltenbrunner had twins, Ursula and Wolfgang (b. 1945) with his long-time mistress, Gisela Gräfin von Westarp (27 June 1920, Wittenberg an der Elbe -
2 June 1983, Munich). All the children survived the war.

SS career
On 18 October 1930, Kaltenbrunner joined the Nazi Party as member number 300,179. In 1931, he was the Bezirksredner (district speaker) for the Nazi Party in Upper Austria. Kaltenbrunner joined the SS on 31 August 1931; his SS number was 13,039. He first became a Rechtsberater (legal consultant) for the NSDAP in 1929 and later held this same position for SS Abschnitt (Section) VIII, beginning in 1932. That same year he began working at his father's law practice, and by 1933 he had become head of the National-Socialist Lawyers' League in Linz.

In January 1934, Kaltenbrunner was briefly jailed at the Kaisersteinbruch detention camp with other Nazis for conspiracy by the Engelbert Dollfuss government.  While there he led a hunger strike which forced the government to release 490 of the party members.  In 1935, he was jailed again on suspicion of high treason. This charge was dropped, but he was sentenced to six months imprisonment for conspiracy and he lost his license to practice law.

From mid-1935 Kaltenbrunner was head of the illegal SS Abschnitt VIII in Linz and was considered a leader of the Austrian SS.  To provide Heinrich Himmler, Reinhard Heydrich and Heinz Jost with new information, Kaltenbrunner repeatedly made trips to Bavaria.  He would hide on a train and on a ship that traveled to Passau, then return with money and orders for Austrian comrades. In 1937 Kaltenbrunner was arrested again by Austrian authorities on charges of heading the illegal Nazi Party organization in  Oberösterreich. He was released in September.

Acting on orders from Hermann Göring, Kaltenbrunner assisted in bringing about the Anschluss with Germany (13 March 1938); he was awarded the role of State Secretary for Public Security in the  Seyss-Inquart cabinet of 11 to 13 March 1938. Controlled from behind the scenes by Himmler, Kaltenbrunner still led, albeit clandestinely, the Austrian SS as part of his duty to  "coordinate" and manage the Austrian population - this entailed the Nazification of  all aspects of Austrian society. Then on 21 March 1938, he was promoted to SS-Brigadeführer. He was a member of the German  Reichstag from 10 April 1938 until 8 May 1945. Amid this activity, he helped establish the Mauthausen-Gusen concentration camp near Linz. Mauthausen was the first Nazi concentration camp opened in Austria following the Anschluss. On 11 September 1938, Kaltenbrunner was promoted to the rank of SS-Gruppenführer (equivalent to a lieutenant general in the army) while holding the position of Führer of SS-Oberabschnitt Österreich (re-designated SS-Oberabschnitt Donau in November 1938). Also in 1938 he was appointed High SS and police leader (Höherer SS- und Polizeiführer; HSSPF) for Oberabschnitt Donau, which was the primary SS command in Austria (he held that post until 30 January 1943).

World War II

In June 1940, Kaltenbrunner was appointed Vienna's chief of police and held that additional post for a year. In July 1940, he was commissioned as a SS-Untersturmführer into the Waffen-SS Reserve. Alongside his many official duties, Kaltenbrunner also developed an impressive  intelligence network across Austria, moving southeastwards, which eventually brought him to Himmler's attention for appointment as chief of the Reich Security Main Office (RSHA) in January 1943. The RSHA was composed of the SiPo (Sicherheitspolizei; the combined forces of the Gestapo and Kripo) along with the SD (Sicherheitsdienst, Security Service). Kaltenbrunner replaced Heydrich, who had been  assassinated in June 1942. Kaltenbrunner held this position until the end of World War II. Hardly anyone knew Kaltenbrunner, and upon his appointment, Himmler transferred responsibility both for SS personnel and for economics from the RSHA to the SS Main Economic and Administrative Office. Nonetheless, Kaltenbrunner was promoted to SS-Obergruppenführer und General der Polizei on 21 June 1943. He also replaced Heydrich as president (serving from 1943 to 1945) of the International Criminal Police Commission (ICPC), the organization today known as Interpol.

Fearing a collapsing  home-front due to the  Allied  bombing campaigns, and worried that another "stab-in-the-back" at home could arise as a result,  Kaltenbrunner immediately tightened the Nazi grip within Germany. From what historian Anthony Read relates, Kaltenbrunner's appointment as RSHA chief came as a surprise given the other possible candidates like the head of the Gestapo, Heinrich Müller, or even the SD foreign-intelligence chief, Walter Schellenberg. Historian Richard Grunberger also added the name of Wilhelm Stuckart, the future minister of the German Interior, as another potential candidate for head of the RSHA; however, he suggests that Kaltenbrunner was most likely selected since he was a comparative "newcomer", expected to be more "pliable" in Himmler's hands.

Like many of the ideological fanatics in the regime, Kaltenbrunner was a committed anti-Semite. According to former SS-Sturmbannführer Hans Georg Mayer, Kaltenbrunner was present at a December 1940 meeting among Hitler, Goebbels, Himmler, and Heydrich where it was decided to gas all Jews incapable of heavy physical work. Under Kaltenbrunner's command, the genocide of Jews picked up pace as "the process of extermination was to be expedited and the concentration of the Jews in the Reich itself and the occupied countries were to be liquidated as soon as possible." Kaltenbrunner stayed constantly informed over the status of concentration-camp activities, receiving periodic reports at his office in the RSHA.

To combat homosexuality across the greater Reich, Kaltenbrunner pushed the Ministry of Justice in July 1943 for an edict mandating compulsory castration for anyone found guilty of this offense. While this was rejected, he still took steps to get the  army to review some 6,000 cases to prosecute homosexuals.

During the summer of 1943, Kaltenbrunner conducted his second inspection of the Mauthausen-Gusen concentration camp. While he was there, 15 prisoners were selected to demonstrate for Kaltenbrunner three methods of killing: by a gunshot to the neck, hanging, and gassing. After the killings were performed, Kaltenbrunner inspected the crematorium and later the quarry. In October 1943, he told Herbert Kappler, the head of German police and security services in Rome, that the "eradication of the Jews in Italy" was of "special interest" for "general security". Four days later, Kappler's SS and police units began rounding up and deporting Jews by train to Auschwitz concentration camp.

In 1944, during an arranged meeting in  Klessheim Castle near Salzburg, when Hitler was in the process of strong-arming Admiral  Horthy into a closer integration between Hungary and Nazi Germany, Kaltenbrunner was present for the negotiations and escorted Horthy out once they were over. Accompanying Horthy and Kaltenbrunner on the journey back to Hungary, Adolf Eichmann brought with him a special Einsatzkommando unit to begin the process of rounding up and deporting Hungary's 750,000 Jews.

It was said that even Himmler feared him, as Kaltenbrunner was an intimidating figure with his  height, facial scars, and volatile temper. Kaltenbrunner was also a longtime friend of Otto Skorzeny and recommended him for many secret missions, allowing Skorzeny to become one of Hitler's favorite agents. Kaltenbrunner also allegedly headed Operation Long Jump, an alleged plan to assassinate  Stalin,  Churchill, and  Roosevelt in Tehran in 1943.

Immediately in the wake of the 20 July Plot on Hitler's life in 1944, Kaltenbrunner was summoned to Hitler's wartime headquarters at the Wolfsschanze (Wolf's Lair) in East Prussia to begin the investigation into who had planned the assassination attempt. Once it was revealed that an attempted military coup against Hitler had been launched, Himmler and Kaltenbrunner had to tread carefully, as the military was not under the jurisdiction of the Gestapo or the SD. When the attempt failed, the conspirators were soon identified. An estimated 5,000 people were eventually executed, with many more sent to concentration camps.

Historian Heinz Höhne counted Kaltenbrunner among the fanatical Hitler loyalists and described him as being committed "to the bitter end". Field reports from the SD in October 1944 about deteriorating morale in the military prompted Kaltenbrunner to urge the involvement of the RSHA in military court-martial proceedings, but this was rejected by Himmler, who thought it unwise to interfere in Wehrmacht (military) affairs. In December 1944, Kaltenbrunner was granted the additional rank of General of the Waffen-SS. On 15 November 1944 he was awarded the  Knights Cross of the War Merit Cross with Swords. In addition, he was awarded the NSDAP Golden Party Badge and the Blutorden (Blood Order). Using his authority as Chief of the RSHA, Kaltenbrunner issued a decree on 6 February 1945 that allowed policemen to shoot "disloyal" people at their discretion, without judicial review.

On 12 March 1945, a meeting took place in Vorarlberg between Kaltenbrunner and Carl Jacob Burckhardt, president of the International Committee of the Red Cross (1945–48). Just over a month later, Himmler was informed that SS-Obergruppenführer (general) Karl Wolff had been negotiating with the Allies for the capitulation of Italy. When questioned by Himmler, Wolff explained that he was operating under Hitler's orders and attempting to play separate Allies against one another. Himmler believed him, but Kaltenbrunner did not, and told Himmler that an informant claimed that Wolff had also negotiated with Cardinal  Schuster of Milan and was about to surrender occupied Italy to the Allies. Himmler angrily repeated the allegations; Wolff, feigning offence, challenged Himmler to present these statements to Hitler. Unnerved by Wolff's demands, Himmler backed down, and Hitler sent Wolff back to Italy to continue his purported disruption of the Allies.

On 18 April 1945, three weeks before the war ended, Himmler named Kaltenbrunner commander-in-chief of the remaining German forces in southern Europe. Kaltenbrunner attempted to organize  cells for post-war sabotage in the region and Germany, but accomplished little. Hitler made one of his last appearances on 20 April 1945 outside the subterranean Führerbunker in Berlin, where he pinned medals on boys from the Hitler Youth for their bravery. Kaltenbrunner was among those present, but realizing the end was near, he then fled from Berlin.

Arrest
On 12 May 1945 Kaltenbrunner was apprehended along with his adjutant, Arthur Scheidler, and two SS guards in a remote cabin at the top of the Totes Gebirge mountains near Altaussee, Austria, by a search party initiated by the 80th Infantry Division, Third U.S. Army. Information had been gained from Johann Brandauer, the assistant burgermeister of Altaussee, that the party was hiding out with false papers in the cabin. This was supported by an eyewitness sighting by the Altaussee mountain ranger five days earlier. Special Agent Robert E. Matteson from the C.I.C. Detachment organized and led a patrol consisting of Brandauer, four ex-Wehrmacht soldiers, and a squad of US soldiers to effect the arrest. The party climbed over mountainous and glacial terrain for six hours in darkness before arriving at the cabin. After a short standoff, all four men exited the cabin and surrendered without a shot fired. Kaltenbrunner claimed to be a doctor and offered a false name. However, upon their arrival back to town his last mistress, Countess Gisela von Westarp, and the wife (Iris) of his adjutant Arthur Scheidler chanced to spot the men being led away; the ladies called out to both men and embraced them. This action resulted in their identification and arrest by US troops. 

In 2001, Ernst Kaltenbrunner's personal Nazi security seal was found in an Alpine lake in Styria, Austria, 56 years after he had thrown it away to hide his identity. The seal was recovered by a Dutch citizen on holiday. The seal has the words "Chef der Sicherheitspolizei und des SD" (Chief of the Security Police and SD) engraved on it. Experts have examined the seal and believe it was discarded in the final days of the European war in May 1945.

Nuremberg trials

At the Nuremberg trials, Kaltenbrunner was charged with conspiracy to commit crimes against peace, war crimes and crimes against humanity. Due to the areas over which he exercised responsibility as an SS general and as chief of the RSHA, he was acquitted of crimes against peace, but held responsible for war crimes and crimes against humanity.

During the initial stages of the Nuremberg trials, Kaltenbrunner was absent because of two episodes of subarachnoid hemorrhage, which required several weeks of recovery time.  After his health improved, the tribunal denied his request for pardon. When he was released from a military hospital he pleaded not guilty to the charges of the indictment against him. Kaltenbrunner said all decrees and legal documents that bore his signature were "rubber-stamped" and filed by his adjutant(s). He also said Gestapo Chief Heinrich Müller had illegally affixed his signature to numerous documents in question.

Kaltenbrunner argued in his defence that his position as RSHA chief existed only theoretically and said he was only active in matters of espionage and intelligence. He maintained that Himmler, as his superior, was the person culpable for the atrocities committed during his tenure as chief of the RSHA. Kaltenbrunner also asserted that he had no knowledge of the Final Solution before 1943 and went on to claim that he protested against the ill-treatment of the Jews to Himmler and Hitler. Further denials from Kaltenbrunner included statements that he knew nothing of the Commissar Order and that he never visited Mauthausen concentration camp, despite documentation of his visit. At one point, Kaltenbrunner went so far as to avow that he was responsible for bringing the Final Solution to an end.

Conviction and execution

On 30 September 1946, the International Military Tribunal (IMT) found Kaltenbrunner not guilty of crimes against peace, but guilty of war crimes and crimes against humanity (counts three and four). On 1 October 1946, the IMT sentenced him to death by hanging.

Kaltenbrunner was executed on 16 October 1946, around 1:15 a.m., in Nuremberg. His body, like those of the other nine executed men and that of Hermann Göring (who committed suicide the previous day), was cremated at the Eastern Cemetery in Munich and the ashes were scattered in a tributary of the River Isar.

Dates of rank

 SS-Mann – 31 August 1931
 SS-Truppführer – 1931
 SS-Sturmhauptführer – 25 September 1932
 SS-Standartenführer – 20 April 1936
 SS-Oberführer – 20 April 1937
 SS-Brigadeführer – 21 March 1938
 SS-Gruppenführer – 11 September 1938
 SS-Untersturmführer der Reserve der Waffen-SS – 1 July 1940
 Generalleutnant der Polizei – 1 April 1941
 SS-Obergruppenführer und General der Polizei – 21 June 1943
 General der Waffen-SS und Polizei – 1 December 1944

Awards and decorations
 Honour Chevron for the Old Guard (1934)
 SS Honour Ring (1938)
 Sword of honour of the Reichsführer-SS (1938)
 Anschluss Medal (1938)
 Sudetenland Medal (1938) with Prague Castle Bar (1939)
 Golden Party Badge (1939)
 SS Long Service Award For 4, 8, and 12 Years Service
 Nazi Party Long Service Award in Bronze and Silver
 Blood Order (31 May 1942)
 German Cross in Silver (1943)
 Knights Cross of the War Merit Cross with Swords (1944)

See also
 Allgemeine SS
 Glossary of Nazi Germany
 Holocaust (miniseries) – TV production in which Kaltenbrunner is portrayed and played by Hans Meyer.
 Inside the Third Reich (film) – television film in which Kaltenbrunner is portrayed
 List SS-Obergruppenführer

References

Notes

Citations

Bibliography

External links

 Kaltenbrunner defense broadcast during Nuremberg Trial, reported by Matthew Halton and broadcast on April 12, 1946; via the archives of the Canadian Broadcasting Corporation; 2m:36s
 Testimony of Rudolf Hoess in the Nuremberg Trial
 Nuremberg film at IMDB
 Seventeen Moments of Spring film at IMDB
 Holocaust miniseries at IMDB

 
 

 
 

 
 

1903 births
1946 deaths
People from Ried im Innkreis District
Austrian anti-communists
Austrian Nazi lawyers
Austrian people convicted of crimes against humanity
Austrian police officers convicted of murder
Einsatzgruppen personnel
Executed Austrian Nazis
Executed military leaders
Gestapo personnel
Holocaust perpetrators
Holocaust perpetrators in Austria
Holocaust perpetrators in Italy
Heinrich Himmler
Interpol officials
Members of the Reichstag of Nazi Germany
People executed by the International Military Tribunal in Nuremberg
Police officers executed for murder
Police officers convicted of crimes against humanity
Recipients of the Knights Cross of the War Merit Cross
Reich Security Main Office personnel
SS and Police Leaders
SS-Obergruppenführer
Holocaust perpetrators in Ukraine
20th-century Austrian lawyers
People executed for crimes against humanity
Prisoners and detainees of Austria
20th-century Freikorps personnel
University of Graz alumni
Executed mass murderers